Notorious is an American crime and legal drama television series broadcast on ABC. The series, starring Piper Perabo and Daniel Sunjata, was announced on May 12, 2016. The series premiered on Thursday, September 22, 2016. On October 25, 2016, the number of episodes was reduced by ABC from thirteen to ten; however, the series remained on the network's schedule until December 8, 2016, when the final episode of the first season was broadcast.
The series was officially cancelled in May 2017.

Plot
The show is based on real-life criminal defense attorney Mark Geragos and Larry King Live news producer Wendy Walker.

Main cast
Piper Perabo as Julia George
Daniel Sunjata as Jake Gregorian
Sepideh Moafi as Megan Byrd
Kate Jennings Grant as Louise Herrick
Ryan Guzman as Ryan Mills
Kevin Zegers as Oscar Keaton
J. August Richards as Bradley Gregorian
Aimee Teegarden as Ella Benjamin

Episodes

Reception

Critical response
Notorious received generally negative reviews from television critics. Rotten Tomatoes gave the show a 25% "rotten" rating with the site's critical consensus read, "Implausible and populated with unlikeable characters, Notorious forsakes dramatic credibility in favor of flash and fluff." By comparison, Metacritic gave the show a score of 32 out of 100, indicating "generally unfavorable reviews".

Ratings

References

External links

American Broadcasting Company original programming
2010s American crime drama television series
2010s American workplace drama television series
2016 American television series debuts
2016 American television series endings
2010s American legal television series
American legal drama television series
Television series about journalism
Television series about television
Television series by ABC Studios
Television series by Sony Pictures Television
English-language television shows